Barry John Anthony Field (born 4 July 1946) is a British former Conservative politician. He was elected Member of Parliament for the Isle of Wight at the 1987 general election, gaining the seat from the Liberal Party. He remained the Member of Parliament for the Isle of Wight until the 1997 general election, where he stood down after 10 years as a Member of Parliament.

References

External links 
 

1946 births
Living people
Conservative Party (UK) MPs for English constituencies
UK MPs 1987–1992
UK MPs 1992–1997
Members of Parliament for the Isle of Wight
People educated at Bembridge School